The Chinese Ambassador to Cuba is the official representative of the People's Republic of China to Cuba.

List of representatives

See also
China–Cuba relations

References 

Ambassadors of China to Cuba
Cuba
China